GMAC ResCap, Inc. was a residential mortgage loan originator and servicer based in Minneapolis, United States. As a result of its exposure to subprime lending during the subprime mortgage crisis, the company filed for bankruptcy protection in 2012 and underwent liquidation in December 2013.

History
In 1982, Residential Funding Company LLC was formed as a subsidiary of Northwest Bank.

In 1990, the company was acquired by GMAC Mortgage Corp.

In 2005, GMAC (now Ally Financial), a subsidiary of General Motors, transferred ownership of GMAC Mortgage Corporation and Residential Funding Corporation (GMAC-RFC) to Residential Capital Corporation (ResCap) and contributed $2 billion of equity.

In January 2007, the company eliminated 1,000 jobs.

In October 2007, the company eliminated 3,000 jobs. At the beginning of 2007, the company had 14,000 employees.

In May 2008, the company reported that it may run out of money.

In June 2008, the company completed a $60 billion refinancing.

In 2009, it was reported that Warren Buffett was evaluating buying the company.

On April 17, 2012, the company missed an interest payment.

On May 14, 2012, the company filed for a pre-packaged bankruptcy that included the separation of the company from its parent, Ally Financial.

On December 11, 2013, the company's Plan of Reorganization was approved by the bankruptcy court.

Litigation
In September 2008, after suffering heavy losses during the subprime crisis, New Jersey Carpenters Health Fund sued the company and the underwriters of residential mortgage-backed securities issued by affiliates of the company, claiming that the prospectuses and registration statements of the RMBS did not adequately disclose the risks, were misleading to investors, and violated securities law. The company settled for $100 million and the 3 underwriters,  Citigroup, Goldman Sachs Group and UBS AG, settled for $235 million, which was approved by the court in 2015.

References

RFC
Financial services companies established in 1982
Financial services companies disestablished in 2013
Mortgage lenders of the United States
Defunct financial services companies of the United States
Defunct companies based in Minneapolis
Subprime mortgage lenders
Subprime mortgage crisis